Time in South Sudan is given by a single time zone, officially denoted as Central Africa Time (CAT; UTC+02:00). South Sudan has observed CAT since 1 February 2021. The country does not have an associated daylight saving time.

History 

Upon the independence of South Sudan from Sudan on 9 July 2011, it observed East Africa Time (EAT; UTC+03:00). On 1 February 2021, South Sudan moved its time ahead one hour to the UTC offset +02:00, adopting Central Africa Time.

IANA time zone database 
In the IANA time zone database, South Sudan is given one zone in the file zone.tab – Africa/Juba. "SS" refers to the country's ISO 3166-1 alpha-2 country code. Data for South Sudan directly from zone.tab of the IANA time zone database; columns marked with * are the columns from zone.tab itself:

See also 
Time in Sudan
List of time zones by country
List of UTC time offsets

References

External links 
Current time in South Sudan at Time.is
Time in South Sudan at TimeAndDate.com

Time in South Sudan